Big Brother 23 is the twenty-third season of the American reality television program Big Brother. The season premiered on July 7, 2021, with a live move-in on CBS in the United States and Global in Canada. CBS renewed Big Brother for an additional season on October 28, 2020, the day the previous season concluded. On the same day, Julie Chen Moonves was confirmed to return as host. 

The season concluded on September 29, 2021, after 85 days of competition. Xavier Prather was crowned the winner defeating Derek Frazier, becoming the first black HouseGuest to win in the main edition of the show in the second unanimous jury vote in a row and the fourth unanimous jury vote in Big Brother US history (following Dan Gheesling of Big Brother 10, Tamar Braxton of Celebrity Big Brother 2 and Cody Calafiore of Big Brother 22). Tiffany Mitchell was voted as the season's America's Favorite HouseGuest.

Format 
Big Brother depicts a group of contestants, known as HouseGuests, who live inside a custom-built house outfitted with cameras and microphones recording their every move 24 hours a day. The HouseGuests are sequestered in the Big Brother House with no contact with the outside world. During their stay, the HouseGuests share their thoughts on events and other HouseGuests inside the Diary Room. Each week, the HouseGuests compete in competitions in order to win power and safety inside the house. At the start of each week, the HouseGuests compete in the Head of Household (abbreviated "HOH") competition. The winner of the HoH competition is immune from eviction and must select two HouseGuests to be nominated for eviction. Six HouseGuests are then selected to compete in the Power of Veto (abbreviated "PoV") competition: the reigning HoH, the nominees, and three other HouseGuests selected by random draw. The winner of the PoV competition wins the right to either revoke the nomination of one of the nominated HouseGuests or leave them as is. If the veto winner uses this power, the HoH must immediately nominate another HouseGuest for eviction. The PoV winner is also immune from being named as the replacement nominee. On eviction night, all HouseGuests must vote to evict one of the nominees. The Head of Household and the nominees are not allowed to vote. This compulsory vote is conducted in the privacy of the Diary Room. In the event of a tie, the Head of Household casts the tie-breaking vote. The nominee with the most votes is evicted from the house. The last nine evicted HouseGuests comprise the Jury and are sequestered in a separate house following their eviction, and ultimately decide the winner of the season. The Jury is not allowed to watch the show except for competitions and ceremonies that include all of the remaining HouseGuests. They are not shown any Diary Room interviews or any footage that might include strategy or details regarding nominations. All evicted HouseGuests are eligible to win this award except for those who either voluntarily leave or are forcibly removed for rule-breaking.

HouseGuests

As a response to racial reckoning in the United States and a lack of diverse representation on television, CBS enacted a policy whereby at least 50% of the cast of its reality shows must be  starting beginning with the 2021–22 broadcast season. The HouseGuests for the twenty-third season were announced on July 1, 2021. Among the 16 HouseGuests is professional boxer Joe Frazier's son Derek Frazier. Christie Valdiserri, a 27-year-old from North Hollywood, California, was originally part of the cast, but tested positive for COVID-19 while in sequester and could not compete. She was replaced by Claire Rehfuss.

Future appearances 
Azah Awasum, Alyssa Lopez, Derek Xiao, Kyland Young, Tiffany Mitchell, and Xavier Prather competed on The Challenge: USA. Tiffany Mitchell returned for Big Brother 24 to host a Power of Veto competition; Tiffany and the remaining members of The Cookout alliance (Xavier Prather, Derek Frazier, Azah Awasum, Kyland Young, and Hannah Chaddha) also returned for a segment during the final 4 eviction episode of this season. Derek Xiao and Claire Rehfuss competed as a team on The Amazing Race 34.

Episodes

Twists
Through various interviews, the show's producers, Allison Grodner and Rich Meehan, debuted the twists for the season.

Teams
HouseGuests were separated into four teams of four during the live premiere, with two males and two females on each team. Four competitions took place throughout the premiere to decide four Team Captains; the captains then received a brief introduction from two randomly selected HouseGuests with the option to select either of them for their team. As with Big Brother 11 and Big Brother 18, Heads of Household earned immunity for their entire team. The team phase of the game concluded after the fourth eviction.

Wildcard Competition
For the first four weeks, the three teams without immunity each selected a teammate to compete in the Wildcard Competition. The winning HouseGuest was given the chance to gain immunity but was given a Wildcard decision in exchange for that immunity; this decision could affect the game for either the Wildcard winner, their teammates, or all HouseGuests. Each HouseGuest could only compete in a Wildcard competition once, unless all other team members had already played. The winner for each week's competition is in bold.

High Roller's Room

For weeks six through eight, the High Roller's Room opened for the final eleven HouseGuests, and an in-game currency, “BB Bucks” (BB$), was introduced. America distributed a certain amount of BB$ to each HouseGuest through text voting; the three HouseGuests with the most votes received BB$100, the next three received BB$75, and the remaining HouseGuests received BB$50. For week eight, additional BB$ were distributed via a random envelope draw after the HoH competition. HouseGuests were not required to use their BB$ immediately and could hold them for as long as possible. 

While the room was open, HouseGuests could use their BB$ to play a game of chance. If they won the game, they would win a power. The stronger the power, the more expensive the game. Powers won are only allowed to be used within the week that it was obtained.

Back-to-Back Double Evictions
This season was the first to feature back-to-back Double Eviction nights over two consecutive weeks instead of Double Evictions spread out by a few weeks, an early eviction night, or a Triple Eviction as done in previous seasons. As a result, Claire, Alyssa, Tiffany and Hannah were all evicted in the span of only two weeks.

Voting history
For the first four weeks, the HouseGuests competed in teams. When a HouseGuest won the Head of Household competition during this phase, they also won immunity for their entire team. On Day 30, the game reverted to the regular format, with the HouseGuests playing as individuals.

Notes

:  A member of this HouseGuest’s team won HoH during the team phase, granting their entire team immunity for the week.
:  Christian's Wildcard Decision was to give immunity to one additional teammate; he chose Xavier.
:  Claire's Wildcard Decision was to choose one week of immunity for her team or immunity until Jury for herself. Claire chose immunity until Jury.
: Kyland bet on Alyssa for the Veto Derby in the High Roller's Room. Since she won the Power of Veto, he won his own Power of Veto for the week. At the Veto Ceremony, Kyland first used his veto on Claire, naming Britini as the replacement; Alyssa did not use her veto.
:  Alyssa won the Chopping Block Roulette in the High Roller's Room, allowing her to save one of the nominees with a roulette wheel determining the replacement nominee. Alyssa saved Derek F. and Xavier was chosen by the wheel as the replacement nominee. Alyssa and Derek F. received immunity for the week.
: Xavier took the "3rd Nominee" punishment in Week 7's PoV Competition and was automatically nominated. His nomination did not need a replacement when the veto was used on him.
: Claire won the Coin of Destiny in the High Roller's Room, allowing her to participate in a coin-flip to replace Tiffany as HoH. Claire won the coin-flip and anonymously replaced Tiffany as HoH. Claire's nominations were made in secret. Tiffany remained immune for the week and could compete in the following HoH. 
: This week was a double eviction week. Following the first eviction, the remaining HouseGuests played a week's worth of games, including HoH and Veto competitions, and nomination, veto and eviction ceremonies, during the live show, culminating in a second eviction for the week.
: As Head of Household, Xavier chose to evict Azah.
: During the finale, the Jury voted for the winner of Big Brother.

Production

Development
CBS announced that Big Brother had been renewed for a twenty-third season on October 28, 2020, with Chen Moonves confirmed to return as host on the same day. On May 13, 2021, it was announced that the season would be premiering on July 7, 2021. Key art for the season was released by Entertainment Weekly on June 16, 2021.

Casting
On January 22, 2021, Robyn Kass announced that Kassting, Inc. would not be providing casting services for the upcoming season. It was announced that Jesse Tannenbaum, former Big Brother casting producer and casting director for Big Brother: Over The Top, Survivor, and The Amazing Race, would be in charge of the casting efforts for Big Brother 23. Several casting producers who cast the show under Kassting, Inc. also returned to cast BB23.

Production design
Photos of the house were revealed on July 5, 2021, via various social media accounts and entertainment news outlets. When explaining the theme, executive producer Allison Grodner stated "Everyone’s longing for vacations, to get out there and so forth. So we really wanted to bring a sense of adventure and vacation fun and a club atmosphere to the house." Immediately upon entering the house two neon signs hung in the entry way, one reading "BB Beach Club" and the other stating "No Risk, No Reward." The living room featured floor-to-ceiling azure and teal tinted glass windows, a handmade shark lamp, and a coffee table built of playing cards. Each of the three bedrooms downstairs were based on different water elements: the first bedroom contained orange and aqua illuminated sea glass on the walls, the next bedroom held four nautical-themed yacht beds, and the final bedroom featured a coral reef design. A shark-themed kitchen and dining room contained an L-shaped kitchen island and numerous shark and fish artwork. Gym equipment for the season was relocated inside, taking the place of the former downstairs lounge. The gym and bathroom were collectively known as "The Spa" and for the first time, a wall was constructed, closing off the kitchen from the bathroom area. On the second floor, the upstairs lounge was designed on a casino game of poker and had black, white, and gold furniture. The Head of Household bedroom was designed around a seaside cabana theme.

Reception

Controversies and criticisms 
Some viewers accused "The Cookout", an all-black six-person alliance, of racism and making voting decisions solely based on race. The alliance was formed as a collective in hopes of combatting the trend from past seasons of minorities being evicted early, as well as having one of its members becoming the main series' first-ever black winner. The "Cookout" term itself stems from African-American culture. Julie Chen Moonves disapproved of the criticism on the topic, saying that the alliance "is not [racist]" in her opinion, adding that "it's hard for some people who are not of color to understand the importance of [The Cookout] making it this far".

Viewing figures

United States

 : Episode 23 was delayed to 8:09 PM ET (7:09 PM CT) due to NFL on CBS overrun
 : Episode 29 was scheduled for 8:30 PM ET (7:30 PM CT) due to afternoon NFL on CBS and was further delayed to 8:34 PM ET due to football overrun
 : Episode 32 was bumped from the schedule to Friday 8:00 PM ET (7:00 PM CT) due to CBS's presentation of the 73rd Primetime Emmy Awards
 : Episode 33 was delayed to 10:00 PM ET (9:00 PM CT) due to the 2-hour season premiere of Survivor 41

Canada

References

External links
  – official American site
  – official Canadian site
 

2021 American television seasons
23